Paul Kowert (born	July 18, 1986) is an American bassist and composer. His styles include classical, bluegrass, and progressive bluegrass. He is a member of the progressive acoustic quintet Punch Brothers and a founding member of Hawktail, an acoustic supergroup composed of Kowert, fiddler Brittany Haas, guitarist Jordan Tice, and mandolinist Dominick Leslie.

Biography 
Kowert grew up in Middleton, Wisconsin. He transitioned to playing bass from violin at age 9. He studied under Edgar Meyer at the Curtis Institute of Music, graduating in 2009. While still pursuing his degree at Curtis, Kowert was recruited to join Punch Brothers. Though Kowert remains the only non-founding member of the ensemble, his arrival in Punch Brothers has been cited as the seminal moment in the band's artistic formation. As bandmate Chris Thile recalls, "that’s when the band really became a band."

Equipment 
Kowert plays a double bass made by luthier Daniel Hachez in 2006 ("Daniel Hachez Bass #28"). Inspired by mentor Edgar Meyer, Kowert plays in an unconventional tuning that combines orchestral tuning and solo tuning. In orchestral (or "standard") tuning, the bass is tuned in ascending fourths from E to G (i.e., E, A, D, G). In solo tuning, the bass is also tuned in fourths but begins a major second above orchestral tuning, running from F# to A (i.e., F#, B, E, A). Kowert's tuning adheres to solo tuning for the instrument's three highest strings but reverts to orchestral tuning for the lowest string (i.e., E, B, E, A). Additionally, Kowert regularly uses a C extension, resulting in an even wider range of pitch (i.e., C, B, E, A).

In addition to his Hachez bass, Kowert regularly plays a Shen SB-180 bass modified by luthier Arnold Schnitzer to include a removable neck. This modification, Kowert claims, has proven indispensable for the demands of touring, particularly with Punch Brothers. "The way we traveled on the Who's Feeling Young Now? tour," Kowert explains, "would not have been possible without this thing."

Kowert uses a bow made by Reid Hudson.

Discography 
With Punch Brothers
 Antifogmatic (2010)
 Who's Feeling Young Now? (2012)
 Ahoy! (2012)
 The Phosphorescent Blues (2015)
All Ashore (2018)
Hell on Church Street (2022)

With Mike Marshall's Big Trio
 Mike Marshall's Big Trio (2009)

With Haas Kowert Tice 
 You Got This (2014)

With Hawktail
 Unless (2018)Formations'' (2020)
 Place Of Growth (2022)

References

American bluegrass musicians
American classical double-bassists
Male double-bassists
Living people
1986 births
Curtis Institute of Music alumni
Musicians from Madison, Wisconsin
People from Middleton, Wisconsin
Classical musicians from Wisconsin
21st-century double-bassists
21st-century American male musicians
Punch Brothers members